is a Japanese television jidaigeki or period drama that was broadcast in 1985 to 1986. It is the 25th in the Hissatsu series.

Plot

Cast
Makoto Fujita as Mondo Nakamura
Masaki Kyomoto as Kumihimoya no Ryu
Hiroaki Murakami as Kajiya no Masa
Ayukawa Izumi as Nandemoya no Kayo
Toshio Shiba as Ichi
Tomio Umezawa as Ni
Shōfukutei Tsurube II as San
Kin Sugai as Sen Nakamura
Mari Shiraki as Ritsu Nakamura
Toshio Yamauchi as Tanaka sama

References

1985 Japanese television series debuts
1980s drama television series
Jidaigeki television series